Al-Jada'an is a sub-district located in the Al Haymah Ad Dakhiliyah District, Sana'a Governorate, Yemen. Al-Jada'an had a population of 3645 according to the 2004 census.

References 

Sub-districts in Al Haymah Ad Dakhiliyah District